K. M. Vasudevan Pillai (born 17 May 1946 in Kerala, India) is an Indian educationist, social entrepreneur, institution-builder, and philanthropist. He is the founder and CEO of the Mahatma Education Society, a not-for-profit trust that manages 48 educational institutions, from schools and colleges to institutions of architecture, management, engineering, vocational education, and teacher training. The institutions are spread over 5 locations (Chembur, Gorai, Panvel, New Panvel, and Rasayani) and serve over 30,000 students. The Mahatma Education Society employs over 2000 teachers, many who have been trained in-house.

Early life and education 
Born into a family of agriculturists, Pillai is one of six children. To acquire an urban education, he was sent to Mumbai in 1962, at the age of sixteen. After completing his post-graduation in English Literature, he worked for a year as a lecturer of English in Somaiya Polytechnic College, Mumbai. Later, he completed his doctoral thesis on the works of the renowned English poet, William Wordsworth, traveling through the length of the Lake District to track the poet's life and sources of inspiration. In 1970, Pillai established the Chembur English High School under the aegis of the Mahatma Education Society .

Family 
Pillai is a long-standing resident of Chembur. In 1981 he married Dr. Daphne Pillai, a lecturer of English Literature at Jaihind College Mumbai. Daphne Pillai was also the Founder President of Soroptimist International, Mumbai-Chembur, and has been responsible for several initiatives for the empowerment of women, including an adult literacy drive in slums.

Achievements 

 Pillai's foremost achievement lies in creating an educational infrastructure in areas of little or no development, areas like Panvel, New Panvel, and Rasayani. In his capacity as a grassroots educator and social entrepreneur, he draws on the transformative powers of education to create self-sufficiency and spur the economic development of a region.
 Pillai is the founder of the Dr. Pillai Global Academies in Gorai and Panvel. They are international schools that offer the International Baccalaureate Diploma Programme and the University of Cambridge schooling programmes. The schools have won many accolades for their state of art of infrastructure and innovative teaching methodologies.
 To create teachers who would be mentors, he started four teacher training institutes.
 He is also the Chairman of Erudite Education Mission, a non-profit organization that fulfills the CSR objectives of the group.
 In 2006, Pillai started an international management exchange programme with St. Mary's College of Business & Economics, California, with a view to expose students to global advancements in management.
 On 6 December 2007, Dr. Pillai was felicitated by Dr. Vijay Khole, the then Vice-Chancellor of the University of Mumbai, for his contributions to social and institutional engineering in education.
 In April 2010, he was part of a high-level national delegation to the BRIC-IBSA Summit in Rio de Janeiro, Brazil.

Publications 
Dr. Pillai  is the author of Edunation: The Dream of an India Empowered, a book that offers  insights into what can be done to transform India's education sector. The book is an exhaustive reference point for policy-makers, institution-builders, teachers and educators.

Further reading 
EduNation: The Dream of an India Empowered, Dr. K. M. Vasudevan Pillai,

References

External links 
 Mahatma Education Society
 Dr. K. M. Vasudevan Pillai
 Dr. Pillai Global Academy, Gorai
 Dr. Pillai Global Academy, New Panvel

1946 births
Living people
Businesspeople from Kerala
Indian philanthropists
Indian social entrepreneurs
Founders of Indian schools and colleges
Educators from Kerala
20th-century Indian educational theorists
20th-century Indian businesspeople